Phoenix Reisen is a Germany-based travel agency that also operates a fleet of cruise ships. The company first entered the cruise business in 1988 by chartering the Soviet Union-owned cruise ship .

History
Phoenix Reisen first begun operating cruises under its own brand in 1988 when the company chartered the West German-built cruise ship  from the Soviet Union-based Black Sea Shipping Company on a 20-year charter agreement. In 1993 a second ship joined the Phoenix Reisen fleet, when  was chartered from V-Ships. Unlike the Maxim Gorkiy, which retained the colours of her owners in Phoenix service, the Albatros was painted in Phoenix Reisen's own colours with a turquoise funnel displaying the company logo.

Due to numerous mechanical problems, Phoenix Reisen decided to prematurely terminate the charter of the Albatros in December 2003. As a replacement Phoenix quickly chartered MS Crown in January 2004, which was renamed . In 2005 the company fleet expanded to include three ships for the first time when  was chartered from V-Ships. In 2008 the first Alexander von Humboldt was replaced by a larger vessel chartered from Club Cruise, confusingly also named  (before entering service the ship was marketed as Alexander von Humboldt II, but she eventually received the same name as the ship she replaced). In late 2008 the charter of the Maxim Gorkiy ended, and due to high fuel prices combined with the high fuel consumption of the ship's steam turbines Phoenix Reisen decided not to renew the charter. In May 2009 Phoenix Reisen chartered  from Nina SpA. 
In April 2011, the company took delivery of MV Artania, which formerly sailed as MV Artemis for P&O Cruises. In July 2019 the fleet was increased with a former HAL ship.

Fleet
Current Fleet (Ocean)

Former Fleet

References

External links

 Phoenix Reisen official website

Companies based in Bonn
Cruise lines
Shipping companies of Germany
Travel and holiday companies of Germany